Rabbi Yitzchak Schochet arrived in the UK in 1991. Having previously served as assistant principle of Oholei Torah Boys School in New York, he assumed the position as Minister of the Richmond Synagogue in Southwest London for two years, while also teaching Advanced Jewish Studies at the Jews Free School. In 1993, at the age of 28, he was offered the position as rabbi of the Mill Hill Synagogue. His vibrancy and dynamism has resulted in a continuous growth of membership, now in excess of 1800 families.

He has a master's degree in Jewish Studies from University College London. He authors numerous articles for newspapers, magazines and journals. He served as Diary Rabbi  to the Guardian Newspaper and also writes for the Jewish Chronicle as well as a very popular weekly column in the Jewish Weekly. He has featured in The London Times as well as Time Magazine International. Rabbi Schochet can often be seen on television including BBC as a regular panelist for The Big Questions as well as CNN.

In 2018 Rabbi Schochet qualified as an accredited mediator and is a member of the Chartered Institute of Arbitrators.

Hailed as one of the most sought after speakers in the Jewish world, Rabbi Schochet has lectured in Russia, Australia, Israel and all parts of the US and Europe and has been rated top speaker at the National Jewish Retreat in the US for several years running. He was also keynote speaker at the International Chabad Conference in New York in 2019 where he addressed 6000 Rabbis and lay leaders.

Rabbi Schochet served on the Chief Rabbi's Cabinet with the portfolio of “family” and as chairman of the Rabbinical Council in the UK. He is currently the longest serving Rabbi in the United Synagogue. He was named by the Jewish Telegraph as one of the ten most influential Rabbis in the United Kingdom. The Jewish Chronicle describes him as “one of the most outspoken Rabbis in the world.”

He is married with five children and grandchildren.

References

External links

Living people
Chabad-Lubavitch rabbis
Rabbis from London
English Orthodox Jews
Year of birth missing (living people)